Gura Jub-e Zeyyed Ali (also Romanized as Gūrā Jūb-e Zeyyed ‘Alī; also known as Gūrā Jūb-e Rīz‘alī, Zeyd ‘Alī, and Zeydarī) is a village in Gurani Rural District, Gahvareh District, Dalahu County, Kermanshah Province, Iran. At the 2006 census, its population was 59, in 14 families.

References 

Populated places in Dalahu County